Priovrazhny is a rural locality (a khutor) in Khopyorskoye Rural Settlement, Novonikolayevsky District, Volgograd Oblast, Russia. The population was 28 as of 2010.

Geography 
Priovrazhny is located 33 km northeast of Novonikolayevsky (the district's administrative centre) by road. Novokardailsky is the nearest rural locality.

References 

Rural localities in Novonikolayevsky District